Stéphane Bernadis (born 23 February 1974) is a French former pair skater. With skating partner Sarah Abitbol, he is the 2000 World bronze medalist, the 2000 Grand Prix Final silver medalist, a seven-time European medalist (two silver and five bronze medals), and a ten-time French national champion.

Career 
Bernadis began skating at age eight because of his mother, English skater Donna Davies. He teamed up with Sarah Abitbol in 1992. Abitbol/Bernadis were coached by Jean-Roland Racle early in their career and then by Stanislav Leonovich in Paris.

At the 2000 World Championships in Nice, France, Bernadis said he was attacked by an unknown assailant with a razor on March 28 when he opened his hotel room door – resulting in an eight-inch cut down his left forearm. Bernadis said he had received a death threat three weeks earlier. At the event, he and Abitbol won the bronze medal, becoming the first French pair skaters to win a World medal since Andrée Brunet / Pierre Brunet won gold in 1932.

An injury to Bernadis led the pair to withdraw after the short program from the 2001 World Championships. They qualified for the 2002 Olympics by winning the 2001 Golden Spin of Zagreb. Abitbol/Bernadis withdrew from the 2002 Olympics after Abitbol's Achilles tendon ruptured in practice – she underwent surgery and was off the ice for six months. After the 2003 European Championships, the pair changed coaches, moving to Jean-Christophe Simond.

Abitbol/Bernadis worked on throw triple Axels.

Personal life 
Bernadis and his wife, Elisabeth, have a daughter named Ava.

Programs 
(with Abitbol)

Results 
with Abitbol

GP: Champions Series / Grand Prix

References

External links

 
 Official website of Abitbol / Bernadis 

1974 births
Living people
Sportspeople from Boulogne-Billancourt
Olympic figure skaters of France
Figure skaters at the 1998 Winter Olympics
French male pair skaters
French people of English descent
World Figure Skating Championships medalists
European Figure Skating Championships medalists